Shanganagh Cemetery is a cemetery in south County Dublin, in the administrative county of Dún Laoghaire–Rathdown just to the south of Shankill. The cemetery consists of two areas, on the Dublin Road, the other to the east, on the western side of the railway between Shankill and Bray. Both areas are bounded by Shanganagh Park to the north.

It holds the graves of Irish  Taoisigh (Prime Minister of Ireland) Garret FitzGerald (1926–2011) and Albert Reynolds (1932–2014).

References

External links
 Cemeteries opening hours – from Dún Laoghaire–Rathdown County Council
 Burial records for Shanganagh and Deans Grange cemeteries
 

Cemeteries in Dún Laoghaire–Rathdown